Nahuel is a male given name of Mapuche origin, nawel meaning jaguar. It is used in Argentina, Chile and Uruguay. It is also used in Spain by descendants of people from those countries.

Notable people named Nahuel
 Matías Nahuel (1996–), Argentine-Spanish professional footballer
 Nahuel Arroyo (1995–), Spanish professional footballer
 Nahuel Bustos (1998–), Argentine professional footballer
 Nahuel Donadell (1991–), Argentine-Chilean professional footballer
 Nahuel Ferraresi (1998–), Argentine-Venezuelan professional footballer
 Nahuel Fioretto (1981–), Argentine professional footballer
 Nahuel Guzmán (1986–), Argentine professional footballer
Nahuel Molina (1998–), Argentine professional footballer
 Nahuel Moreno (1924–1987), Argentine politician
 Nahuel Pérez Biscayart (1986–), Argentine actor
 Nahuel Quiroga (1991–), Argentine professional footballer
 Nahuel Sachak (1991–), Spanish-Paraguayan pop singer
 Nahuel Valentini (1988–), Argentine professional footballer
 Nahuel Pennisi (1990-), Argentine singer

Fictional characters
Nahuel, the main protagonist of the Chilean-Brazilian animated film Nahuel and the Magic Book

References

Mapuche
Masculine given names
Mapuche given names
Spanish masculine given names